Battle of Sievierodonetsk may refer to:
 Battles of Sievierodonetsk (2014)
 Battle of Sievierodonetsk (2022)